A list of mainland Chinese films released in 1999:

See also 
 1999 in China

References

External links
IMDb list of Chinese films

Chinese
Films
1999